Pine Hills Trail is a planned multi-use trail in the area of Pine Hills, Florida, built by Orange County Parks and Recreation. It utilizes a power easement between the Shingle Creek Trail, with a route planned to Kissimmee, and West Orange Trail. A groundbreaking for the trail was held in 2006, but it was held up by budget cuts. After many years of inaction, the trail was finally opened in 2017.

References

Hiking trails in Florida
Protected areas of Orange County, Florida